The Black Album (stylised as The BLACK ALBUM) is an unofficial compilation album of solo material by members of the British rock group The Beatles. It was created by the American actor Ethan Hawke, and became widely known as a result of its inclusion in Richard Linklater's 2014 film Boyhood. Hawke compiled the record to give to his daughter Maya on her 13th birthday in 2011, including personalised liner notes; it was then incorporated into Boyhood in scenes shot later that year, with Hawke's character giving it to his son as a birthday present.

The compilation contains 51 tracks from Beatles members following the band's breakup in 1970. Critical reaction to The Black Album was generally positive: The Desert Sun described it as "a great listen", while USA Today called it "quite a compilation". In an analysis for the New York Daily News, Jim Farber suggested that the record was "a metaphor for divorce".

Concept
A lifelong fan of the Beatles, Hawke compiled The Black Album for his daughter Maya following his divorce from her mother Uma Thurman, and presented it to her on her 13th birthday on 8 July 2011. The record consisted of 51 songs from the Beatles' members following their breakup in 1970. John Lennon had 19 songs on the compilation from his solo career and his collaborations with the Plastic Ono Band, Paul McCartney had 20 from his solo career and his collaborations with Wings and Linda McCartney, George Harrison had seven songs from his solo career, and Ringo Starr had four. Additionally, the song "Real Love"—a Lennon demo reworked and overdubbed by McCartney, Harrison and Starr for the compilation Anthology 2—was included on The Black Album. Included with the three-disc collection was a set of liner notes in the form of a personalised letter from Hawke to his daughter, explaining his motivation for creating the album.

Usage in Boyhood

Since 2002, Hawke had been starring in Boyhood, an ongoing 12-year film project directed by the American director Richard Linklater. Boyhood chronicles the life of Mason Evans (Ellar Coltrane) from the ages of six to 18, with scenes shot each year between 2002 and 2013. Hawke portrays Mason's father, Mason Evans Sr. While filming scenes in 2011 for Mason's 15th birthday, Linklater decided to incorporate The Black Album into the film, by having Mason Sr. gift the compilation to his son as a birthday present. In the film, Mason Sr. explains: "Whenever you listen to too much of the solo stuff it kind of becomes a drag, you know? But you put them next to each other, right, and they start to elevate each other. And then you can hear it: it's the Beatles." He describes the record as being the "perfect segue" of solo Beatles material.

During promotion of the film, Linklater was asked at a Q&A in Chicago if the album actually existed. Linklater confirmed that it did, and explained that he and Hawke were looking for a way to distribute its full track listing to the public. Hawke eventually revealed the track listing and an adaptation of its liner notes on 21 July 2014 in an exclusive article for the website BuzzFeed.

Reception
Critical reaction to Hawke's compilation was generally positive. In an analysis of The Black Album, Jim Farber of the New York Daily News suggested that the record was "a metaphor for divorce", and noted that Hawke had selected tracks that were recorded as the Beatles' members were approaching maturity and writing songs about more mature subject matter. Trey Barrineau of USA Today said the album was "quite a compilation", while Peter Howell of the Toronto Star called it "unique". The Desert Sun described it as "a great listen" and were inspired to create their own shorter version of the album, which featured only 12 tracks consisting of solo material from 1970 to 1971.

Track listing

See also
Works that explore similar concepts
Everyday Chemistry
"The Twelfth Album"

References

External links
The Beatles Black Album from Boyhood at Facebook
The Beatles Black Album from Boyhood at Spotify

2014 compilation albums
The Beatles
Unofficial adaptations